Tizek is a rural locality (a settlement) in Razdolnensky Selsoviet, Rodinsky District, Altai Krai, Russia. The population was 104 as of 2013. There are 3 streets.

Geography 
Tizek is located 50 km northwest of Rodino (the district's administrative centre) by road. Razumovka is the nearest rural locality.

References 

Rural localities in Rodinsky District